Rosoy is a commune in the Yonne département, in the French region of Bourgogne-Franche-Comté.

Merged with Sens since 1973, the commune was recreated on 12 February 2008.

See also
 Communes of the Yonne department

References

Communes of Yonne